William Kennedy (December 19, 1854 – June 19, 1918) was a U.S. Representative from Connecticut.

Born in Naugatuck, Connecticut, Kennedy attended the public schools, and later studied law.  He was admitted to the bar in 1879 and commenced practice in Naugatuck, Connecticut, handling criminal cases, in particular.

Kennedy was the Chairman of the Naugatuck Democratic Town Committee and Clerk of the Borough Court.  In 1895, he was appointed Borough Attorney, staying in this position until 1918.  Kennedy also served as member on Naugatuck's Board of Education from 1901-1918.

Kennedy served as Member of the State Senate from 1899–1901, and a delegate to the Democratic National Conventions in 1896, 1900, 1908, and 1912.  He was the Chairman of the Democratic State Committee.  He was elected as a Democrat to the 63rd United States Congress in 1912 and represented Connecticut's 5th Congressional District from March 4, 1913, to March 3, 1915.  Kennedy was an unsuccessful candidate for re-election in 1914 and resumed his law practice.  
He is known to have corresponded with Woodrow Wilson on policy matters, particularly during Wilson's presidential election campaign and during World War I.

Kennedy died on June 19, 1918, and was interred in St. James' Cemetery in Naugatuck, Connecticut.  His obituary was published in the New York Times.

References

External links
 http://www.naugatuckhistory.com/hi-irish-influence-in-naugatuck.htm
 https://timesmachine.nytimes.com/timesmachine/1918/06/20/106215385.pdf

1854 births
1918 deaths
School board members in Connecticut
Connecticut local politicians
Democratic Party Connecticut state senators
People from Naugatuck, Connecticut
Democratic Party members of the United States House of Representatives from Connecticut
19th-century American politicians